Düz Bilici (also, Düzbilici, Bilidzhikozma, and Dyuzbilidzhi) is a village and municipality in the Davachi Rayon of Azerbaijan.  It has a population of 270.  The municipality consists of the villages of Düz Bilici, Çinarlar, and Zağlı.

References 

Populated places in Shabran District